Arcana is Swedish neoclassical dark wave band created in 1994 by Peter Bjärgö.

History
The original band consisted of founder Peter Bjärgö (then Peter Pettersson) and vocalist Ida Bengtsson. Since 2002, Arcana has changed line-up and now consists of Peter Bjärgö, Stefan Eriksson, Ann-Mari Thim, Ia Bjärgö and Mattias Borgh.

Often largely instrumental, the band describes its music as inspired by medieval music or the middle age's more romantic aspects. Their album Le Serpent Rouge had a more oriental feeling to it, with instruments like hammered dulcimer, finger cymbals, duduk and other oriental/Arabic instruments. Since 2006, Arcana is signed to Kalinkaland Records in Germany.

Peter also has a martial industrial side-project called Sophia and has also recorded one collaborative album with Gustaf Hildebrand.

Discography
Their first album Dark Age of Reason, released on Cold Meat Industry, has been compared to the early works by Dead Can Dance.

The third album ...The Last Embrace was published in 2000. It introduced the acoustic guitar and real percussion instruments to Arcana's repertoire.

The sixth album Le Serpent Rouge was released in 2004 on Erebus Odor Records. It features orientally inspired music and a stronger integration of acoustic instruments than previously.

2008 saw the release of "Raspail" on Kalinkaland Records. Arcana's earlier Neo-classical and medieval style returned with this album.

As Arcana

As Bjärgö/Hildebrand

In other media
The remake of the Dead Can Dance song "Enigma of the Absolute" was used in the soundtrack for the popular Civilization 4 mod Fall from Heaven 2 as background music for the Runes Of Kilmorph religion.

The composition "Wings of Gabriel" was used in the soundtrack for the popular Medieval 2: Total War mod Broken Crescent as a main theme.

References

External links
 Official website
 
Arcana discography at Discogs

Projekt Records artists
Swedish dark wave musical groups
Swedish musical groups
Neoclassical dark wave musical groups
Musical groups established in 1994
Dark ambient music groups
1994 establishments in Sweden